Fairy Bridge may refer to:
 Fairy Bridge (Isle of Man), one of two locations on the Isle of Man in the British Isles
 Fairy Bridge (Isle of Skye), a storied stone bridge near Dunvegan in Scotland
 Xianren Bridge in China, the world's largest natural arch

no:Fairy Bridge